Rena Mason is an American horror fiction author of Thai-Chinese descent and a three-time winner of the Bram Stoker Award.

Her literary debut, The Evolutionist, won the Bram Stoker Award for Best First Novel in 2013, while her novella East End Girls was nominated for the Bram Stoker Award for Best Long Fiction.

Her 2014 short story "Ruminations" tied for the Bram Stoker Award for Best Short Fiction. That same year, she was a Quarter-Finalist in the 2014 First Annual Stage 32/The Blood List Search for New Blood Screenwriting Contest for her co-written screenplay RIPPERS.

In 2018, her novelette The Devils Throat won the Bram Stoker Award for Best Long Fiction. She also received a 2014 Silver Hammer Award from the Horror Writers Association, given in recognition of extraordinary volunteerism by a member of the association.

She has published a number of short stories in various magazines and anthologies. She is a member of the Horror Writers Association, Mystery Writers of America, International Thriller Writers, and International Screenwriter Association.

An avid scuba diver and registered nurse, Mason lives in Reno, Nevada, with her family.

Notable works

"The Eyes Have It". Horror For Good: A Charitable Anthology (Volume 1). Cutting Block Press. 2012.
"Awk-Ward". The Haunted Mansion Project: Year Two Anthology. Damnation Books LLC. 2013.
“Death Squared”. Fear the Reaper Anthology. Crystal Lake Publishing.  2013.
 East End Girls. Anthology coauthored with Gord Rollo. JournalStone. 2013.
"Reclamation". Getting Better All the Time: Las Vegas Writers Explore Progress Anthology. Huntington Press. 2013.
 The Evolutionist. Nightscape Press. 2013.
 Ruminations. First published in Qualia Nous, edited by Michael Bailey. Written Backwards. 2014.
 “The Year After Publication…” Horror 101: The Way Forward  Nonfiction. Crystal Lake Publishing.  2014.
“Fathoms’ Embrace”. Another Dimension Magazine Anthology.  2015.
“Jaded Winds”. The Library of the Dead Anthology. Written Backwards. 2015.
“Nita Kula”. Blurring the Line Anthology. Cohesion Press. 2015. 
“Red Hill”. Shadows Over Main Street Anthology. Hazardous Press. 2015.
“What Happened in Vegas…”. Shrieks and Shivers Anthology. The Horror Zine. 2015.
“Metamorphic Apotheosis”. Beauty of Death Vol. 1 Anthology. Independent Legions Publishing. 2016.
“Sky is Falling”. Madhouse Anthology. Dark Regions Press. 2016
“Winter’s Dollhouse”. Tales from the Lake Vol. 2 Anthology. Crystal Lake Publishing. 2016.
“I Will Be the Making of You”. Adam’s Ladder Anthology. Written Backwards. 2017.
“Of Earth and Bone”. The Forsaken Anthology. Cemetery Dance. 2017.
“The Devil’s Throat”. Hellhole Anthology. Adrenaline Press. 2018.
“Clevengers of the Carrion Sea”. The Seven Deadliest Anthology. Cutting Block Books. 2019.
Strange Tales of the Macabre: Haunted Journeys Anthology. Editor. 5X5 Publishing. 2019.

See also
List of horror fiction authors

References

External links
 
 

20th-century American novelists
American fantasy writers
American women short story writers
American women novelists
Living people
Women science fiction and fantasy writers
20th-century American women writers
20th-century American short story writers
Year of birth missing (living people)
21st-century American women